Otter Rapids, also known as White Otter Rapids, is an unincorporated place and dispersed rural community in geographic Pitt Township in the Unorganized North Part of Cochrane District in Northeastern Ontario, Canada. It is located 148.9 km south of Moosonee and 120 km north of Smooth Rock Falls.

The community is on the west side (left bank) of the Abitibi River adjacent to the Otter Rapids Generating Station, downstream of the Abitibi Canyon Generating Station and community of Abitibi Canyon, and upstream of Coral Rapids.

Transportation
The Ontario Northland Railway runs through this community. Otter Rapids is also accessible by a gravel road that connects via Abitibi Canyon to Ontario Highway 634 at Fraserdale, and by an airstrip suitable for small aircraft.

During winter months Wetum Road connects Otter Rapids to Moose Factory, Ontario as a winter road.

References

Communities in Cochrane District